Bronson Murray Cutting (June 23, 1888May 6, 1935) was a United States senator from New Mexico. A prominent progressive Republican, he had also been a newspaper publisher and military attaché.

Biography
Bronson Cutting was born in Great River, Long Island, New York, on June 23, 1888, at his family's country seat of Westbrook. He was the third of four children born to William Bayard Cutting (1850–1912) and Olivia Peyton Murray (1855–1949).

He attended the common schools and Groton School and graduated from Harvard University in 1910 where he was a member of the Delphic Club. Shortly after graduation, he became an invalid due to recurrent tuberculosis and moved to Santa Fe, New Mexico, at the advice of his doctors to restore his health. He became a newspaper publisher in 1912 and published the Santa Fe New Mexican and El Nuevo Mexicano. From 1912 to 1918 he served as president of the New Mexican Printing Company, and of the Santa Fe New Mexican Publishing Corporation from 1920 until his death.

During World War I, Cutting was commissioned a captain and served as an assistant military attaché of the American Embassy in London, in 1917 and 1918. He was regent of the New Mexico Military Institute in 1920 and served as chairman of the board of commissioners of the New Mexican State Penitentiary in 1925.

U.S. senator
On December 29, 1927, Cutting was appointed as a Republican to the United States Senate to fill the vacancy caused by the death of Andrieus A. Jones. He served until December 6, 1928, when a duly elected successor, Octaviano Ambrosio Larrazolo, qualified to serve the remainder of the term, which expired March 3, 1929. Cutting was not a candidate in the special election to fill this vacancy, which took place on November 6, 1928, the same day as the general election in which the seat was up for a full six-year term, beginning March 4, 1929. Larrazolo was not a candidate for election to the full term, and Cutting was elected to it, returning to the Senate after only three months away. Cutting was re-elected in 1934, winning a very close race (with 76,226 votes to Democrat Dennis Chavez's 74,944) in a failed year for Republicans.

He was a co-sponsor of the Hare–Hawes–Cutting Independence Act which aimed to grant the Philippine Islands a ten-year commonwealth status with virtually full autonomy, to be followed by the recognition of Filipino independence. The bill was enacted over President Herbert Hoover's veto. However, the law was rejected by the Philippines legislature, and the Tydings–McDuffie Act (authored by Millard Tydings, a Maryland Democrat), was instead passed by Congress and accepted by the Philippines legislature.

Freedom of the press
Cutting raised the debate on the national level about the government's censorship powers. Via tariff bills dating back to the nineteenth century, the U.S. government, through the Customs Service, had the power to confiscate "obscene" materials arriving to the country. A tariff bill introduced in 1929 sought to expand this power by modifying Section 305 to prohibit printed materials suggesting treason or threatening the life of the president. Senator Cutting, inspired by the complaints of a constituent, opposed the change and attacked Section 305 in its entirety as "irrational, unsound, and un-American." Through several impassioned speeches, Cutting suggested eliminating Section 305. Ultimately, he was forced to compromise and introduced an amendment removing the references to treason. The amendment passed by only two votes and Cutting received widespread public praise from publishers, librarians, booksellers, authors and civil liberties organizations.

As the tariff bill moved toward final confirmation, various senators, notably Reed Smoot of Utah, attempted to restore Section 305 to its original state, while others proposed further draconian measures. Ultimately, portions of Smoot's amendments were combined with those of other senators to create a compromise. Cutting's efforts to create a national debate about censorship were successful, but are now forgotten because the 1929 tariff bill became known as the Smoot-Hawley Tariff Act.

Roosevelt's New Deal and the Chicago plan
Crossing party lines and supporting Franklin D. Roosevelt in the 1932 presidential election, Cutting played a key role in the political struggles over the reform of banking which Roosevelt undertook while dealing with the Great Depression, and which resulted in the Banking Reform Acts of 1933 and 1935.  As a supporter of the Chicago plan proposed by economist Irving Fisher and others at the University of Chicago, Cutting was among a handful of influential senators who might have been able to remove from the private banks their ability to manipulate the money supply by enforcing a 100 percent reserve requirement for all credit creation, as stipulated in the Chicago plan. His death in an airliner crash cut short what may have been his most enduring legacy to the nation.

Death and legacy
On May 6, 1935, on his way from Albuquerque to Washington, D.C., Cutting died in the crash of TWA Flight 6 (a Douglas DC-3) in bad weather near Atlanta, Missouri.

Senator Cutting's death was to have national impact in that it would lead Congress to commission the highly controversial Copeland Committee report on air traffic safety.

Dennis Chavez, who had been Cutting's Democratic opponent in 1934, was appointed by the governor to fill Cutting's seat in the Senate.

Cutting is interred in Green-Wood Cemetery in Brooklyn, New York.

See also
 List of United States Congress members who died in office (1900–49)

References

Sources

 Nolan, M.S. (1999). Fundamentals of Air Traffic Control. Pacific Grove, California: Brooks Cole Publishing Company.

Further reading
Bronson Cutting, politician by G. L. Seligman in Ellis, Richard N., (1971) New Mexico, past and present: a historical reader. University of New Mexico Press, Albuquerque, New Mexico. 
Keleher, William Aloysius, (1969) Memoirs, 1892–1969 : a New Mexico item. Rydal Press: Santa Fe, N.M.
 Lowitt, Richard (1992) Bronson M. Cutting: Progressive politician University of New Mexico Press, Albuquerque, New Mexico. 
 Walkiewicz, E. P. and Witemeyer, Hugh (eds.) (1995) Ezra Pound and Senator Bronson Cutting: A political correspondence, 1930-1935 University of New Mexico Press, Albuquerque, New Mexico. 
 Biography of U.S. Congress - CUTTING, Bronson Murray, (1888 - 1935)

1888 births
1935 deaths
People from Islip (town), New York
Bayard family
Livingston family
Schuyler family
Van Cortlandt family
Republican Party United States senators from New Mexico
New Mexico Republicans
20th-century American politicians
Groton School alumni
Harvard University alumni
American military personnel of World War I
Military personnel from New York (state)
United States military attachés
Victims of aviation accidents or incidents in 1935
Victims of aviation accidents or incidents in the United States
Accidental deaths in Missouri
Burials at Green-Wood Cemetery
Cutting family